Sam Hjalmar Rydberg (27 October 1885 – 25 March 1956) was a Swedish composer.

Biography 
Sam Rydberg was born in Nyköping, Sweden, in 1885. He started as a military musician at age 13 as a drummer at the Södermanland Regiment. After that he became a part of the military band of the Svea Engineer Corps 1906-1935 and after 1928 as the head of the band. The instrument he played was soprano cornet.

He composed many types of music but is most known for his marches. He is also the composer that has most marches that is official marches of regiments in the Swedish Armed Forces and is sometimes referred as the Swedish march king.

List of marches 
Avanti
Avanti per Patria
Defiladmarsch
Den svenske underofficeren 
För fosterlandet 
Gardeskamrater
I beredskap 
I fält 
I flaggskrud 
I täten 
Ikaros 
Italia 
Nordiska spelen
På marsch 
På post för Sverige
På vakt 
På vakt vid Östersjön 
Till fronten 
Tre kronor 
Under fredsfanan 
Vivu Esperanto

Literature 
Stolt, Lars C. (1975). ”Sam Rydberg — Sveriges marschkung”. Marschnytt (34): sid. 5-9.

References 

1885 births
1956 deaths
Brass band composers
March musicians
Military music of Sweden
Military music composers
Military musicians
Swedish composers
Swedish male composers
Swedish Army officers
20th-century Swedish male musicians